Sisindiran (Banten dialect: Susualan, Badui language: Bangbalikan) is a Sundanese poem in which an allusion (sindir) is given by a combination of words which allude to the real meaning by sound association. Sisindiran (susualan) are often found in Sundanese verse: in tembang Sunda they occur mainly in the Panambih Songs. They invariably consist of a cangkang ("cover, rind, skin") without meaning, followed by a eusi ("content" or "essence"), the real meaning. The association between the "cover" and the real meaning is indicated by structural correspondences of sound and patterns. If the sound patterns of the cangkang and the eusi are parallel, the sisindiran is termed a paparikan. This is the case for instance, in the following poem where the first two lines constitute the cangkang and the third and the fourth lines the eusi:

In Indonesian, such paparikan, consisting as a rule of four lines of eight syllables each, are called pantun, not to be confused with the Sundanese (carita) pantun. However, this Indonesian (Malay) pantun often has lines that do not contain exactly eight syllables (see for examples in Braasem 1950).

See also
Sundanese people

References

Poetic forms
Sundanese literature